Kombolcha Airport  is an airport serving Kombolcha and Dessie in Ethiopia. Construction began in 2010. It replaces the now closed Kombolcha dirt runway airport at 11°4'57"N 39°42'41"E.

Airlines and destinations

References

External links
Ethiopian Airlines domestic routes
 OurAirports - Ethiopia
  Great Circle Mapper - Combolcha
 Combolcha

Airports in Ethiopia
Amhara Region